Briffault is a surname. Notable people with the surname include:
Herma Briffault (1898–1981), American translator and ghostwriter
Richard Briffault, American legal scholar
Robert Briffault (1874–1948), French surgeon, social anthropologist, and novelist